The Type 160 is an early large automobile manufactured by the French company Automobiles Peugeot in 1913. It was constructed by French private coachbuilder Jean-Henri Labourdette to be styled like a small boat, a trait from which it was also called the Skiff. In 2011, the Type 160 was exhibited by Bonhams in a collection entitled "110 years of the automobile" at the Grand Palais. The Type 160 currently resides at the Seal Cove Auto Museum in Seal Cove, Maine

See also 

 Peugeot
 List of Peugeot vehicles

References 

Peugeot vehicles
Cars introduced in 1913
1910s cars